The Peacock Eel or Spotfin Spiny Eel (Macrognathus siamensis) is a spiny eel found in freshwater habitats throughout Southeast Asia. They are commercially important as food and aquarium fish.

Distribution 
The peacock eel is native to the Mekong and Chao Phraya basins, which make up the countries of Thailand, Cambodia, Laos, and Vietnam. They are mostly found in slow-moving backwaters that have a sandy or muddy bottom.

There is an invasive population of peacock eels in the Everglades region of Florida, most likely being released due to the aquarium trade. The eels were first discovered in the C-111 canal in 2002, and in 2004 were also found to inhabit mangrove swamps further south.

Description and ecology
The peacock eels is found in slow-moving or still bodies of water such as swamps, canals, and ponds. These fish lack scales and require a soft substrate to burrow into, such as sand, mud, or silt. They breed during the wet season when adjacent forests flood. Larvae reach 8 cm (2 in) in length in approximately 60 days after hatching. Their main diet is small crustaceans, annelids, and fish.

This eel can grow up to 30 cm (12 in) in length, although 20 cm (8 in) is more common. Males and females are hard to tell apart through external means.

References

External links
Fishbase

siamensis
Fish described in 1861
Taxa named by Albert Günther